"Happened on a Saturday Night" is a song co-written and recorded by Canadian country artist Tebey. The song was co-written with Danick Dupelle and Jimmy Thow. It was the third single from Tebey's third studio album The Good Ones.

Background
Tebey said the song is about "life changing, epic moments in life" and "connections, friendships, new love and great memories that can present themselves when you least expect them". The song was only written as a result of the COVID-19 pandemic. Tebey and Danick Dupelle could not get together to finish his album The Good Ones in early 2020 as planned due to pandemic restrictions, which led to more time for additional songwriting, subsequently resulting in "Happened on a Saturday Night" being written.

Critical reception
Chris Country said the song is "ultra-catchy", describing it as "the perfect tune to have us all reminiscing about our most memorable summer nights". Courtney Fielder of Country100 called the song the "perfect song to cruise on into a weekend with".

Commercial performance
"Happened on a Saturday Night" reached a peak of number 8 on the Billboard Canada Country chart dated November 21, 2020, marking Tebey's seventh Top 10 hit. It also peaked at number 98 on the Billboard Canadian Hot 100, his first charting entry there since his cover of "Wake Me Up" in 2014. It has been certified Gold by Music Canada.

Music video
The official music video for "Happened on a Saturday Night" was directed by Ryan Nolan and premiered on July 18, 2020.

Charts

Certifications

References

2020 songs
2020 singles
Tebey songs
Songs written by Tebey
Songs written by Danick Dupelle
Song recordings produced by Danick Dupelle